La Paz Department may refer to:

 La Paz Department, Catamarca, Argentina
 La Paz Department, Entre Ríos, Argentina
 La Paz Department, Mendoza, Argentina
 La Paz Department (Bolivia)
 La Paz Department (El Salvador)
 La Paz Department (Honduras)

See also
 La Paz (disambiguation)

Department name disambiguation pages